Oxycanus loesus is a moth of the family Hepialidae. It is found in New South Wales and Victoria.

References

Moths described in 1935
Hepialidae
Endemic fauna of Australia